The Central Missouri Activities Conference, or CMAC, is a high school athletic conference comprising large-size high schools located in central Missouri. The conference members are located in Boone, Cole, and Pettis counties.

Members
Founded in 2020, the Central Missouri Activities Conference consists of seven high schools. The conference consists of Class 5 and Class 6 schools (in boys' basketball), the two largest classes in Missouri.

References

Missouri high school athletic conferences
High school sports conferences and leagues in the United States